Pauline Jeanneret (born 1 March 1987) is a French curler.

Teams

Women's

Mixed doubles

References

External links
 
 
 
 

Living people
1987 births
French female curlers
French curling champions